Manchester Local School District may refer to:

Manchester Local School District (Adams County), Adams County, Ohio
Manchester Local School District (Summit County), Ohio